U.S. Route 63 (US 63) is the portion of a north-south highway that runs through the U.S. state of Missouri from the Arkansas state line near Thayer to the Iowa state line near Lancaster.

Route description

The highway passes south-to-north through Missouri, from Arkansas to Iowa, serving cities such as Rolla, Jefferson City, Columbia, Moberly, Macon, and Kirksville. Notable routes that are intersected include U.S. Route 160 and U.S. Route 60 in Howell County, Interstate 44 at Rolla, U.S. Route 50 (which it shares a concurrency with into Jefferson City south of the Missouri River until it reaches the junction with U.S. 54), US Route 54 (which it overlaps in Jefferson City from the junction with U.S. Route 50 and crosses the Missouri River with on the Jefferson City Bridge), Interstate 70 at Columbia, U.S. Route 24 at Moberly, U.S. Route 36 at Macon, and U.S. Route 136 at Lancaster.

The road enters the state (passing the Oregon County line) at Thayer. Immediately after leaving Thayer, U.S. 63 intersects Route 19, then continues into Howell County on a two-lane highway with alternating passing lanes, then the highway enters West Plains. The highway then widens to a four-lane divided highway, bypassing West Plains to the south and west, intersecting U.S. Route 160 then continues on a divided highway to Willow Springs. The route then joins US Route 60, and the two highways run concurrently northwest to Cabool. 

North of Cabool, the highway returns to two-lane status (with alternating passing lanes), passing through Houston and intersecting Route 32 in Licking. The highway then enters Phelps County and passes through Rolla, the home of Missouri University of Science and Technology, and becomes locally known as Bishop Avenue. In Rolla, Route 63 intersects Route 72, and later, Business Loop 44. The Business Loop runs concurrently with Route 63 past the University's campus to Interstate 44, where the Business Loop ends. As it leaves Rolla, the highway quickly narrows to two lanes. US 63 between Rolla and US 50 is being studied for improvements. It crosses into Maries County toward Vienna, intersecting Highway 42. After entering Osage County, Route 63 passes through Freeburg and Westphalia. A few miles north of Westphalia, Highway 63 widens to a four-lane divided highway, and almost immediately intersects US Route 50, and the two highways' head west toward Jefferson City, the state capital. After passing through downtown on the Whitton Expressway, the route leaves Route 50, joining the eastbound direction of US Route 54 to cross the Missouri River into Callaway County.

After crossing the river, Route 63 exits Route 54, and heads north on a four-lane divided highway. About five miles north of US 54, the highway enters Boone County, then after five miles more, leaves the Ozark Plateau and enters the Columbia metropolitan area. Highway 63 passes through the eastern edge of Ashland then passes along the eastern edge of Columbia, but gains freeway status for about 10 miles (16 km) through town. In the north part of town, Route 63 intersects Interstate 70. There is no direct connection between Route 63 and I-70; access to and from the Interstate is via an at-grade connector road, which intersects I-70 at a simple Diamond interchange. The route then leaves Columbia, returning to expressway status, and intersects Route 22 near Clark, right on the Boone-Randolph county line. After passing by Clark proper, U.S. 63 gains a Business Route, which passes through the otherwise-bypassed town of Renick, then passes through the city of Moberly. Mainline Route 63, meanwhile, upgrades to a freeway for about four miles as it passes through Moberly, intersecting US Route 24 at an interchange on the northern end of town.

Heading north, U.S. 63 leaves the Columbia metropolitan area and enters Macon County just north of Jacksonville, and heads toward the city of Macon. Through town, the highway narrows to a two-lane city street, with a center left-turn lane. Near the northern edge of town, US 63 intersects US Route 36, which is part of the Chicago-Kansas City Expressway. Leaving Macon, the highway re-gains expressway status, and passes by La Plata before crossing into Adair County. South of Kirksville, the route interchanges with a Business Route, which passes through the city proper, while mainline Route 63 narrows to two lanes and enters a newly-constructed bypass to the east of town. While on the bypass, the highway intersects Route 6 and Missouri Route 11, and the two east-west state routes form a three-mile long Wrong-way concurrency with each other following US 63. Leaving the Kirksville bypass, US 63 returns to a two-lane surface highway, and enters Schuyler County. Near Lancaster, the highway intersects US Route 136, which briefly overlaps with Route 63 into Lancaster itself. There, Route 136 turns east, while Route 63 continues north into Iowa, exiting Missouri about five miles north of Lancaster.

History
U.S. 63 in Missouri was Route 7 from 1922 to 1926.

Junction list

References

External links

 Missouri
Streets in Columbia, Missouri
Transportation in Oregon County, Missouri
Transportation in Howell County, Missouri
Transportation in Texas County, Missouri
Transportation in Phelps County, Missouri
Transportation in Maries County, Missouri
Transportation in Osage County, Missouri
Transportation in Cole County, Missouri
Transportation in Callaway County, Missouri
Transportation in Boone County, Missouri
Transportation in Randolph County, Missouri
Transportation in Macon County, Missouri
Transportation in Adair County, Missouri
Transportation in Schuyler County, Missouri
63